Pavona is a hamlet in Lazio, central Italy. It is a frazione of the comune (municipality) of Albano Laziale. However, its traditional territory is also included in those of Castel Gandolfo and Rome.

Overview 
The Albano fraction includes some 7,600 inhabitants, the other two amounting to c. 3,500 and 2,000, respectively.

The patron saint of Pavona is St. Joseph, celebrated on May 1.

See also 
 Cecchina

References

External links 

 

Frazioni of Albano Laziale
Castelli Romani
Castel Gandolfo